Legislative elections were held in South Korea on April 9, 2008. 
The conservative Grand National Party won 153 of 299 seats while the main opposition United Democratic Party won 81 seats. This election marked the lowest-ever voter turnout of 46.0%.

Political parties

As of April 9, 2008, there were six political parties represented in the 18th National Assembly of South Korea, in addition to independents:
Grand National Party (한나라당, Hannara-dang), led by Kang Jae-seop. The current major conservative party within the National Assembly. (153 seats won)
United Democratic Party (통합민주당, Tongham Minju-dang), led by Son Hak-gyu. The current major liberal party within the National Assembly. (81 seats won)
Liberty Forward Party (자유선진당, Jayu Seonjin-dang), led by Lee Hoi-chang. The Chungcheong Region-strongholder and current second conservative party within the National Assembly against the GNP. (18 seats won)
Pro-Park Alliance (친박연대, Chin-bak Yeon-dae), led by Seo Cheong-won, although their inspirational leader is former GNP leader Park Geun-hye. A conservative coalition with Park Geun-hye within the National Assembly that broke away from the GNP after a dispute on the GNP's candidate nomination, which happened just before the election. (14 seats won)
Democratic Labor Party (민주노동당, Minju Nodong-dang), led by Chun Young-se. A minor but the most progressive party within the 18th National Assembly, against both the Grand Nationals and Democrats. (5 seats won)
Creative Korea Party (창조한국당, Changjo Hanguk-dang), led by Moon Kook-hyun. A minor but pro-environmental liberal party within the National Assembly, against the Grand Nationals. (3 seats won)
(no seats) The New Progressive Party (진보신당) Jinbo Shin-dang), led by Sim Sang-jeong and Roh Hoe-chan, won 2.94% votes but not enough to gain any seats. The New Progressive Party split from the Democratic Labor Party as a reaction to nationalism after the 2007 presidential elections.

Results

By region

Notes

References

2008 elections in South Korea
Legislative elections in South Korea